David George Lemoine (born May 25, 1957) is an American politician from Maine. Lemoine, a Democrat served in the Maine House of Representatives from 1998 to 2004 prior to serving as the State Treasurer of Maine from 2005 to 2010.

Career
Lemoine was born in Waterville, Maine to Margaret Hatch Marden and George Macalease Lemoine. His mother was the daughter of a potato farmer in Freedom, Maine and his father was a Waterville native and Korean War veteran. He grew up in Waterville and graduated from Waterville High School prior to attending Colby College. At Colby, he majored in government. After graduating, he interned with Senator Edmund Muskie's office in Washington, D.C. and worked for the Senate Sergeant at Arms Office until Muskie became United States Secretary of State. He then served on George J. Mitchell's staff. In 1988, he graduated from the University of Maine School of Law and in 1998 was elected to serve the first of three consecutive terms in the Maine House of Representatives, representing Old Orchard Beach.  In 2004 he was elected as Maine State Treasurer and was reelected in 2006 and 2008.

References

1957 births
Living people
Politicians from Waterville, Maine
People from Old Orchard Beach, Maine
Democratic Party members of the Maine House of Representatives
Colby College alumni
University of Maine School of Law alumni
State treasurers of Maine